Sir Charles Scott Sherrington  (27 November 1857 – 4 March 1952) was an eminent English neurophysiologist. His experimental research established many aspects of contemporary neuroscience, including the concept of the spinal reflex as a system involving connected neurons (the "neuron doctrine"), and the ways in which signal transmission between neurons can be potentiated or depotentiated. Sherrington himself coined the word "synapse" to define the connection between two neurons. His book The Integrative Action of the Nervous System (1906) is a synthesis of this work, in recognition of which he was awarded the Nobel Prize in Physiology or Medicine in 1932 (along with Edgar Adrian). 

In addition to his work in physiology, Sherrington did research in histology, bacteriology, and pathology. He was president of the Royal Society in the early 1920s.

Biography

Early years and education
Official biographies claim Charles Scott Sherrington was born in Islington, London, England, on 27 November 1857, and that he was the son of James Norton Sherrington, a country doctor, and his wife, Anne Thurtell. However James Norton Sherrington was an ironmonger and artist's colourman in Great Yarmouth, not a doctor, and died in Yarmouth in 1848, nearly 9 years before Charles was born. 

In the 1861 census, Charles is recorded as Charles Scott (boarder, 4, born India) with Anne Sherrington (widow) as the head and Caleb Rose (visitor, married, surgeon). He was brought up in this household with Caleb recorded as head in 1871, although Anne and Caleb did not marry until after the death of his wife in 1880. 

The relationship between Charles and his childhood family is unknown. During the 1860s the whole family moved to Anglesea Road, Ipswich, reputedly because London exacerbated Caleb Rose's tendency to asthma.

Sherrington's origins have been discussed in several published sources: Chris Moss and Susan Hunter, in the Journal of Medical Biography of January 2018, presented an article discussing the potential origins of Charles Sherrington, i.e. whether he was born in India of unknown parents, or was the illegitimate child of Caleb Rose and Anne Sherrington. 

Erling Norrby, PhD, in Nobel Prizes and Notable Discoveries (2016) observed: "His family origin apparently is not properly given in his official biography. Considering that motherhood is a matter of fact and fatherhood a matter of opinion, it can be noted that his father was not James Norton Sherrington, from whom his family name was derived. Charles was born 9 years after the death of his presumed father. Instead Charles and his two brothers were the illegitimate sons of Caleb Rose, a highly regarded Ipswich surgeon." 

In Ipswich Town: A History, Susan Gardiner writes: "George and William Sherrington, along with their older brother, Charles, were almost certainly the illegitimate sons of Anne Brookes, née Thurtell and Caleb Rose, a leading surgeon from Ipswich, with whom she was living in College Road, Islington at the time that all three boys were born. No father was named in the baptism register of St James' Church, Clerkenwell, and there is no official record of the registration of any of their births. It was claimed they were the sons of a country doctor, James Norton Sherrington. However, it was with Caleb Rose that Anne and the three Sherrington boys moved to Anglesea Road, Ipswich in 1860 and the couple were married in 1880 after Caleb's first wife had died." 

Judith Swazey, in Reflexes and Motor Integration: Sherrington's Concept of Integrative Action (1969), quotes Charles Scott Sherrington's son, Carr Sherrington: "James N. Sherrington was always called Mr. and I have no knowledge that he was a Dr. either in law or in medicine... [He] was mainly interested in art and was a personal friend of J. B. Crone and other painters."

Caleb Rose was noteworthy as both a classical scholar and an archaeologist. At the family's Edgehill House in Ipswich one could find a fine selection of paintings, books, and geological specimens. Through Rose's interest in the Norwich School of Painters, Sherrington gained a love of art. Intellectuals frequented the house regularly. It was this environment that fostered Sherrington's academic sense of wonder. Even before matriculation, the young Sherrington had read Johannes Müller's Elements of Physiology. The book was given to him by Caleb Rose.

Sherrington entered Ipswich School in 1871. Thomas Ashe, a famous English poet, taught at the school. Ashe served as an inspiration to Sherrington, instilling a love of classics and the desire to travel.

Rose had pushed Sherrington towards medicine. Sherrington first began to study with the Royal College of Surgeons of England. He also sought to study at Cambridge, but a bank failure had devastated the family's finances. Sherrington elected to enroll at St Thomas' Hospital in September 1876 as a "perpetual pupil". He did so in order to allow his two younger brothers to do so ahead of him. The two studied law there. Medical studies at St. Thomas's Hospital were intertwined with studies at Gonville and Caius College, Cambridge. Physiology was Sherrington's chosen major at Cambridge. There, he studied under the "father of British physiology," Sir Michael Foster.

Sherrington played football for his grammar school, and for Ipswich Town Football Club; he played rugby for St. Thomas's, was on the rowing team at Oxford. During June 1875, Sherrington passed his preliminary examination in general education at the Royal College of Surgeons of England (RCS). This preliminary exam was required for Fellowship, and also exempted him from a similar exam for the Membership. In April 1878, he passed his Primary Examination for the Membership of the RCS, and twelve months later the Primary for Fellowship.

In October 1879, Sherrington entered Cambridge as a non-collegiate student. The following year he entered Gonville and Caius College. Sherrington was a first-rate student. In June 1881, he took Part I in the Natural Sciences Tripos (NST) and was awarded a Starred first in physiology; there were nine candidates in all (eight men, one woman), of whom five gained First-class honours (Firsts); in June 1883, in Part II of the NST, he also gained a First, alongside William Bateson. Walter Holbrook Gaskell, one of Sherrington's tutors, informed him in November 1881 that he had earned the highest marks for his year in botany, human anatomy, and physiology; second in zoology; and highest overall. John Newport Langley was Sherrington's other tutor. The two were interested in how anatomical structure is expressed in physiological function.

Sherrington earned his Membership of the Royal College of Surgeons on 4 August 1884. In 1885, he obtained a First Class in the Natural Science Tripos with the mark of distinction. In the same year, Sherrington earned the degree of M.B., Bachelor of Medicine and Surgery from Cambridge. In 1886, Sherrington added the title of L.R.C.P., Licentiate of the Royal College of Physicians.

Seventh International Medical Congress

The 7th International Medical Congress was held in London in 1881. It was at this conference that Sherrington began his work in neurological research. At the conference controversy broke out. Friedrich Goltz of Strasbourg argued that localized function in the cortex did not exist. Goltz came to this conclusion after observing dogs who had parts of their brains removed. David Ferrier, who became a hero of Sherrington's, disagreed. Ferrier maintained that there was localization of function in the brain. Ferrier's strongest evidence was a monkey who suffered from hemiplegia, paralysis affecting one side of the body only, after a cerebral lesion.

A committee, including Langley, was made up to investigate. Both the dog and the monkey were chloroformed. The right hemisphere of the dog was delivered to Cambridge for examination. Sherrington performed a histological examination of the hemisphere, acting as a junior colleague to Langley. In 1884, Langley and Sherrington reported on their findings in a paper. The paper was the first for Sherrington.

Travel
In the winter of 1884–1885, Sherrington left England for Strasbourg. There, he worked with Goltz. Goltz, like many others, positively influenced Sherrington. Sherrington later said of Goltz that:
"[h]e taught one that in all things only the best is good enough."

A case of asiatic cholera had broken out in Spain in 1885. A Spanish doctor claimed to have produced a vaccine to fight the outbreak. Under the auspices of Cambridge University, the Royal Society of London, and the Association for Research in Medicine, a group was put together to travel to Spain to investigate. C.S. Roy, J. Graham Brown, and Sherrington formed the group. Roy was Sherrington's friend and the newly elected professor of pathology at Cambridge. As the three travelled to Toledo, Sherrington was skeptical of the Spanish doctor. Upon returning, the three presented a report to the Royal Society. The report discredited the Spaniard's claim.

Sherrington did not meet Santiago Ramón y Cajal on this trip. While Sherrington and his group remained in Toledo, Cajal was hundreds of miles away in Zaragoza.

Later that year Sherrington travelled to Rudolf Virchow in Berlin to inspect the cholera specimens he procured in Spain. Virchow later on sent Sherrington to Robert Koch for a six weeks' course in technique. Sherrington ended up staying with Koch for a year to do research in bacteriology. Under these two, Sherrington parted with a good foundation in physiology, morphology, histology, and pathology. During this period he may have also studied with Waldeyer and Zuntz.

In 1886, Sherrington went to Italy to again investigate a cholera outbreak. While in Italy, Sherrington spent much time in art galleries. It was in this country that Sherrington's love for rare books became an obsession.

Employment

In 1891, Sherrington was appointed as superintendent of the Brown Institute for Advanced Physiological and Pathological Research of the University of London, a center for human and animal physiological and pathological research. Sherrington succeeded Sir Victor Alexander Haden Horsley. There, Sherrington worked on segmental distribution of the spinal dorsal and ventral roots, he mapped the sensory dermatomes, and in 1892 discovered that muscle spindles initiated the stretch reflex. The institute allowed Sherrington to study many animals, both small and large. The Brown Institute had enough space to work with large primates such as apes.

Liverpool
Sherrington's first job of full-professorship came with his appointment as Holt Professor of Physiology at Liverpool in 1895, succeeding Francis Gotch. With his appointment to the Holt Chair, Sherrington ended his active work in pathology. Working on cats, dogs, monkeys, and apes that had been bereaved of their cerebral hemispheres, he found that reflexes must be considered integrated activities of the total organism, not just the result of activities of the so-called reflex-arcs, a concept then generally accepted. There he continued his work on reflexes and reciprocal innervation. His papers on the subject were synthesized into the Croonian lecture of 1897.

Sherrington showed that muscle excitation was inversely proportional to the inhibition of an opposing group of muscles. Speaking of the excitation-inhibition relationship, Sherrington said "desistence from action may be as truly active as is the taking of action." Sherrington continued his work on reciprocal innervation during his years at Liverpool. Come 1913, Sherrington was able to say that "the process of excitation and inhibition may be viewed as polar opposites [...] the one is able to neutralize the other." Sherrington's work on reciprocal innervation was a notable contribution to the knowledge of the spinal cord.

Oxford
As early as 1895, Sherrington had tried to gain employment at Oxford University. By 1913, the wait was over. Oxford offered Sherrington the Waynflete Chair of Physiology at Magdalen College. The electors to that chair unanimously recommended Sherrington without considering any other candidates. Sherrington enjoyed the honor of teaching many bright students at Oxford, including Wilder Penfield, who he introduced to the study of the brain. Several of his students were Rhodes scholars, three of whom – Sir John Eccles, Ragnar Granit, and Howard Florey – went on to be Nobel laureates. Sherrington also influenced American pioneer brain surgeon Harvey Williams Cushing.

Sherrington's philosophy as a teacher can be seen in his response to the question of what was the real function of Oxford University in the world. Sherrington said:
"after some hundreds of years of experience we think that we have learned here in Oxford how to teach what is known. But now with the undeniable upsurge of scientific research, we cannot continue to rely on the mere fact that we have learned how to teach what is known. We must learn to teach the best attitude to what is not yet known. This also may take centuries to acquire but we cannot escape this new challenge, nor do we want to." 

 While at Oxford, Sherrington kept hundreds of microscope slides in a specially constructed box labelled "Sir Charles Sherrington's Histology Demonstration Slides". As well as histology demonstration slides, the box contains slides which may be related to original breakthroughs such as cortical localization in the brain; slides from contemporaries such as Angelo Ruffini and Gustav Fritsch; and slides from colleagues at Oxford such as John Burdon-Sanderson – the first Waynflete Chair of Physiology – and Derek Denny-Brown, who worked with Sherrington at Oxford (1924–1928)).

Sherrington's teachings at Oxford were interrupted by World War I. When the war started, it left his classes with only nine students. During the war, he laboured at a shell factory to support the war and to study fatigue in general, but specifically industrial fatigue. His weekday work hours were from 7:30am to 8:30pm; and from 7:30am to 6:00pm on the weekends.

In March 1916, Sherrington fought for women to be admitted to the medical school at Oxford.

He lived at 9 Chadlington Road in north Oxford from 1916 to 1934, and on 28 April 2022 an Oxfordshire blue plaque in his honour was unveiled on this house.

Retirement
Charles Sherrington retired from Oxford in the year of 1936. He then moved to his boyhood town of Ipswich, where he built a house. There, he kept up a large correspondence with pupils and others from around the world. He also continued to work on his poetic, historical, and philosophical interests. From 1944 until his death he was President of the Ipswich Museum, on the committee he had previously served.

Sherrington's mental faculties were crystal clear up to the time of his sudden death, which was caused by a sudden heart failure at age 94. His bodily health, however, did suffer in old age. Arthritis was a major burden. Speaking of his condition, Sherrington said "old age isn't pleasant[,] one can't do things for oneself." The arthritis put Sherrington in a nursing home in the year before his death, in 1951.

Family
On 27 August 1891, Sherrington married Ethel Mary Wright (died 1933), daughter of John Ely Wright of Preston Manor, Suffolk, England. They had one child, a son named Charles ("Carr") E.R. Sherrington, who was born in 1897. 

On weekends during the Oxford years the couple would frequently host a large group of friends and acquaintances at their house for an enjoyable afternoon.

Publications

The Integrative Action of the Nervous System
Published in 1906, this was a compendium of ten of Sherrington's Silliman lectures, delivered at Yale University in 1904. 

The book discussed neuron theory, the "synapse" (a term he had introduced in 1897, the word itself suggested by classicist A. W. Verrall), communication between neurons, and a mechanism for the reflex-arc function. The work effectively resolved the debate between neuron and reticular theory in mammals, thereby shaping our understanding of the central nervous system. 

He theorized that the nervous system coordinates various parts of the body and that the reflexes are the simplest expressions of the interactive action of the nervous system, enabling the entire body to function toward a definite purpose. Sherrington pointed out that reflexes must be goal-directive and purposive. Furthermore, he established the nature of postural reflexes and their dependence on the anti-gravity stretch reflex and traced the afferent stimulus to the proprioceptive end organs, which he had previously shown to be sensory in nature ("proprioceptive" was another term he had coined). The work was dedicated to Ferrier.

Mammalian Physiology: a Course of Practical Exercises
The textbook was published in 1919 at the first possible moment after Sherrington's arrival at Oxford and the end of the War.

The Assaying of Brabantius and other Verse
This collection of previously published war-time poems was Sherrington's first major poetic release, published in 1925. Sherrington's poetic side was inspired by Johann Wolfgang von Goethe. Sherrington was fond of Goethe the poet, but not Goethe the scientist. Speaking of Goethe's scientific writings, Sherrington said "to appraise them is not a congenial task."

Man on His Nature
A reflection on Sherrington's philosophical thought. Sherrington had long studied the 16th century French physician Jean Fernel, and grew so familiar with him that he considered him a friend. During the academic year 1937-38, Sherrington delivered the Gifford lectures at the University of Edinburgh. They focused on Fernel and his times, and formed the basis of Man on His Nature. The book was published in 1940, with a revised edition in 1951. It explores philosophical thoughts about the mind, human existence, and God, in accordance with natural theology. Chapters of the book align with the twelve zodiac signs. In his ideas on mind and cognition, Sherrington introduced the idea that neurons work as groups in a "million-fold democracy" to produce outcomes rather than with central control.

Honours and awards

Sherrington was elected a Fellow of the Royal Society (FRS) in 1893.
 1899 Baly Gold Medal of the Royal College of Physicians of London
 1905 Royal Medal of the Royal Society of London
 1922 Knight Grand Cross of the Most Excellent Order of the British Empire
 1922 President of the British Association for the year 1922–1923
 1924 Order of Merit
 1932 Nobel Prize for Physiology or Medicine

At the time of his death Sherrington received honoris causa Doctors from twenty-two universities: Oxford, Paris, Manchester, Strasbourg, Louvain, Uppsala, Lyon, Budapest, Athens, London, Toronto, Harvard, Dublin, Edinburgh, Montreal, Liverpool, Brussels, Sheffield, Bern, Birmingham, Glasgow, and the University of Wales.

Eponyms

Liddell-Sherrington reflex Associated with Edward George Tandy Liddell and Charles Scott Sherrington, the Liddell-Sherrington reflex is the tonic contraction of muscle in response to its being stretched. When a muscle lengthens beyond a certain point, the myotatic reflex causes it to tighten and attempt to shorten. This can be felt as tension during stretching exercises.

Schiff-Sherrington reflex Associated with Moritz Schiff and Charles Scott Sherrington, describes a grave sign in animals: rigid extension of the forelimbs after damage to the spine. It may be accompanied by paradoxical respiration – the intercostal muscles are paralysed and the chest is drawn passively in and out by the diaphragm.

Sherrington's First Law Every posterior spinal nerve root supplies a particular area of the skin, with a certain overlap of adjacent dermatomes.

Sherrington's Second Law The law of reciprocal innervation. When contraction of a muscle is stimulated, there is a simultaneous inhibition of its antagonist. It is essential for coordinated movement.

Vulpian-Heidenhain-Sherrington phenomenon Associated with Rudolf Peter Heinrich Heidenhain, Edmé Félix Alfred Vulpian, and Charles Scott Sherrington. Describes the slow contraction of denervated skeletal muscle by stimulating autonomic cholinergic fibres innervating its blood vessels.

See also
 List of presidents of the Royal Society

References

External links

 
 
 

1857 births
1952 deaths
Academics of King's College London
Alumni of Fitzwilliam College, Cambridge
Alumni of Gonville and Caius College, Cambridge
British neuroscientists
British Nobel laureates
Fellows of Gonville and Caius College, Cambridge
Fellows of Magdalen College, Oxford
Fullerian Professors of Physiology
Members of the Order of Merit
Knights Grand Cross of the Order of the British Empire
Nobel laureates in Physiology or Medicine
People educated at Ipswich School
English pathologists
Fellows of the Royal Society
Foreign associates of the National Academy of Sciences
Presidents of the Royal Society
Royal Medal winners
Recipients of the Copley Medal
Waynflete Professors of Physiology
English Nobel laureates
Ipswich Town F.C. players
English footballers
The Journal of Physiology editors
Association footballers not categorized by position